The Orthotonophonium is a free reed aerophone similar to a Harmonium with 72 (sometimes 53) keys per octave, that can be played all diatonic key intervals and chords using just intonation. The instrument was created in 1914 by German physicist Arthur von Oettingen to advance his theories of harmonic dualism (now knows as Riemann theory).

Etymology 
The word 'Orthotonophonium is a portmanteau of the Greek words ορθός = correct, τόνος = tone und φωνή = sound.

 Background 
The concept of true intonation keyboards traces back to the 16th Century, with the work of Italian musicologists Gioseffo Zarlino and Nicola Vicentino. Zarlino tried to reproduce meantone temperament in all keys on a single instrument, without having to retune it. To this end, Zarlino created an instrument called the Archicembalo, which used 19 tone equal temperament. The instrument used two manuals and thirty six keys per octave.

Around 1850, American inventor Henry Ward Poole an enharmonic organ, which did not require finger substitution upon note changes. In 1863, Perronet Thompson built an organ with 65 keys per octave, which could be played with pure intonation in 21 major and minor keys. The German physicist Hermann von Helmholtz also experimented on this theme during this period, using his own instrument - the Reinharmonium.

German physicist Arthur von Oettingen became interested in microtonal tuning in the 1870s, later developing the idea for a harmonium using 72 or 53 keys, with which almost any chord using thirds, fourths, and fifths. The first Orthotonophonium was built in 1914 by German instrument manufacturer Schiedmayer.Klaus Gernhardt, Hubert Henkel, Winfried Schrammek: Orgelinstrumente, Harmoniums, Katalog, Band 6, Musikinstrumenten-Museum der Karl-Marx-Universität, Deutscher Verlag für Musik, Leipzig (1983); Beschreibung des Orthotonophoniums im Museum für Musikinstrumente der Universität Leipzig

 Functionality 
When playing in equal temperament, beats are unadvoidable due to the Pythagorean comma. This interference can be advoided playing on an Orthotonophonium, since the pitch of a tone can be chosen such that only pure intervals are played. This is achieved by using a different tuning system - 72TET. Unlike a piano, where there are only twelve keys per octave, on an Orthotonophonium, the player has the choice of several pitches per tone. This eliminates enharmonics, since for example, a G♯ can be altered several cents higher than an A♭.'''

 Further reading 

 Karl Traugott Goldbach: Arthur von Oettingen und sein Orthotonophonium im Kontext, in: Jahrbuch des Staatlichen Instituts für Musikforschung, Preußischer Kulturbesitz / Staatliches Institut für Musikforschung Berlin,'' S. 192–227, Band 2008/2009, Mainz (2009)

References 

Musical tuning
Free reed aerophones